Re-Purpose is an instrumental rock album by former Dread Zeppelin guitarist Carl Jah. It is Jah's first album as a solo artist.

Release and reception 
Re-Purpose was released in 2012. In 2013, Guitar Player praised the album's sense of humor and Jah's ability to tie in many disparate musical elements; also in 2013 a Toledo Free Press review described the album as "fresh and original", praising the multi-layered guitar work and catchy riffs.

Track listing

References 

Instrumental rock albums
2012 albums